Family is an American television drama series that aired on the American Broadcasting Company (ABC) television network from 1976 to 1980. It was originally conceived as a limited series; its first season consisted of six episodes. A total of 86 episodes were produced. Creative control of the show was split among executive producers Leonard Goldberg, Aaron Spelling, and Mike Nichols.

Overview 
Family depicted, for its time, a contemporary traditional family with realistic, believable characters. The show starred Sada Thompson and James Broderick as Kate and Doug Lawrence, a happily married upper-middle-class couple living at 1230 Holland Street in Pasadena, California with their three children: Nancy (portrayed by Elayne Heilveil in the original miniseries, then by Jane Actman for the first 2 episodes of Season 2, and finally Meredith Baxter Birney (who re-filmed Actman’s scenes and played the Nancy character for the remainder of the show's run); Willie (Gary Frank); and Letitia, nicknamed "Buddy" (Kristy McNichol). 

The eldest daughter character of Nancy had a young son, Timothy (called Timmy, portrayed by siblings Michael and David Shackelford). Timmy was named after a younger brother who died off-screen years prior in a freak fishing canoe accident that was briefly mentioned in season one. 

Family raised the profile of all of its featured actors and, in particular, catapulted Kristy McNichol and Meredith Baxter Birney to stardom.

 Kate is the practical, rational voice of the show. She always stands by her opinion and is motivated to do what is right, even if it makes her unpopular ("Jury Duty"). An accomplished full-time homemaker, she resents people telling her that because she had high aspirations in school and had achieved a great deal academically ("Home Movie"), she could have attained much more in life. However, at one point she expresses frustration with the monotony of her life, feeling that all she does is run errands and make phone calls, usually on behalf of other people ("An Eye to the Future"). She eventually returns to college as a music major, then becomes a music teacher at Buddy's high school in season 4. 
 Doug, the family patriarch, is an independent lawyer who aspires to be a judge but never uses his intellect to make others feel inferior. He is a family man who listens to what Kate tells him and always makes time for his children. 
 Willie, Doug and Kate's son, is an aspiring writer. He secures his parents' permission to take a year off high school to write a screenplay but, to his father's chagrin, later drops out of school completely. He later pursues work, assisting in a photography studio, an advertising agency, and at a TV show called "The Dame Game" but eventually quits, dubbing the work uninspiring, and aspires to leave Pasadena.
 Younger daughter Buddy (Letitia), is somewhat tomboyish, although she sometimes considers adopting a more feminine appearance ("Coming of Age"). She is a loyal friend, compassionate toward others, and well-liked by her classmates. She has a habit of walking into a room where adults are discussing something confidential and demanding to know what is transpiring. She usually seeks her mother's help when faced with a dilemma. Her mother often calls her the nickname “Tizzy Lish.” Willie has a close sibling relationship with Buddy, whom he affectionately calls "Peaches."
 Eldest daughter Nancy Lawrence Maitland's move back home with her young son, Timmy, is the story catalyst during the premiere episode. She does so after catching her husband, Jeff Maitland (played by John Rubinstein, who also composed the show's theme song), in bed with another woman. They divorce soon after and Nancy enrolls in law school, where she excels. Nancy lives in the small guest house in the backyard of the Lawrence family home, and she later moves to a nearby apartment in Pasadena.

In the 1978 fourth season, eleven-year-old Andrea “Annie” Cooper (Quinn Cummings) is adopted by the family after the off-screen death of her biological parents, Kate and Doug's college friends, in a car accident. Annie excels in academics with her extensive vocabulary and strives to fit in with her new family and classmates at school.

Storylines were often topical. Family often featured what has come to be known as "very special episodes". In the first episode, Nancy walks in on her husband, Jeff, having sex with one of her friends. During the second season she and Jeff divorce, but he appears occasionally thereafter to complicate the Lawrences' lives. Other storylines include Kate's possible breast cancer and Buddy's dilemmas about whether to have sex; she always chooses to wait. Other episodes deal with homosexuality: in a 1976 episode ("Rites of Friendship"), Willie's childhood friend, Zeke Remsen, is arrested in a gay bar and Willie struggles to accept his friend's sexuality, while a 1977 episode ("We Love You, Miss Jessup") deals with Buddy's friendship with a lesbian teacher. Family also contends with alcoholism (Doug's sister; Buddy's friend) and dementia: A 1979 episode directed by Joanne Woodward guest-stars Henry Fonda as Doug's father, who is beginning to experience cognitive decline. Two years later, Fonda would win an Academy Award for playing a similar character in On Golden Pond.

Episodes and production details

The initial showrunners of Family were Nigel McKeand and Carol Evan McKeand, who previously had been writers for The Waltons. After the fourth season, the McKeands departed and were replaced by Edward Zwick, who would go on to produce the acclaimed series thirtysomething, My So-Called Life and Once and Again.

The pilot episode was filmed inside a private residence located at 1230 Milan Avenue in South Pasadena, California. A set, that was almost identical to the house, was built at 20th Century Studios in Century City (Los Angeles), California to film all other episodes. The exterior shots of the Lawrence family home were filmed at the same private residence for the duration of the series.

The house has been featured in the following productions:
1) Honey, We Shrunk Ourselves (1997 film); 2) Jurassic Park III (2001 film); 3) Bringing Down the House (2003 film); 4) The Whispers (2015 television series); 5) “Red Baron” pizza “Sweet 16” commercial ad (2022).

Broadcast history and Nielsen ratings

Notable guest stars

Many well-known (or soon-to-be well-known) actors and actresses appeared on the series, including Howard Hesseman, Ted Danson, Michael J. Fox, Willie Aames, Leif Garrett, Doris Roberts, Lauren Tewes, Vic Tayback, Linda Lavin, Tommy Lee Jones, James Woods, Michael Keaton, Lance Kerwin, Kim Cattrall, Lisa Whelchel, Charlotte Rae, Shelley Long, Henry Fonda, Dinah Manoff, Mare Winningham, Helen Hunt, Kim Richards, Dana Plato, Jennifer Jason Leigh, Annie Potts, Blair Brown, Alice Ghostley, Jameson Parker, Dominique Dunne, Steve Guttenberg, René Auberjonois and Stephanie Zimbalist.

Meredith Baxter's real-life mother, Whitney Blake, guest starred, as did David Birney, who was Baxter's husband at the time.

Critical reception
Family was widely acclaimed, with many television critics calling it a rare quality offering in ABC's primetime schedule, which at the time contained light-hearted shows such as Happy Days, Laverne & Shirley and The Love Boat. 

The principal cast of Family was featured on the January 21-27, 1978, and March 15-21, 1980, covers of TV Guide magazine.

In the fourth season, some critics took issue with the show's direction. In February 1979, Noel Holston of the Orlando Sentinel called Family "ABC's most prestigious program" but claimed "the producers' crisis-of-the-week approach is starting to strain the series' credibility." Some critics complained that Family, like many TV shows of the period, had become too reliant on sex-related plots. In spring 1979, ABC shifted the show to a Friday night death slot of 8 p.m. Eastern Time, and its previously solid ratings dropped to near the bottom of the chart. As a result, Family was renewed for a final season of 13 episodes that began at mid-season and aired intermittently.

Despite its occasionally adult themes, the series was consistently praised by the National Parent-Teacher Association. In February 1979, the PTA said Family contained "good parenting lessons" and "slightly controversial" but "excellent" content, recommending it for viewing by teens and older.

Seven years after the series' cancellation, it was widely reported that a Family Reunion TV movie was planned for the 1987–88 season. At least one report indicated that if its ratings were strong enough, the series would be revived for the then-current ABC schedule. The plot was to involve the Lawrence children gathering for Kate's remarriage. (James Broderick had died of cancer in 1982.) But the writers' strike that year halted production, and the project was abandoned.

Awards and nominations

Theme music and opening credits
In the original spring 1976 miniseries run of Family, the theme music is a dramatic-sounding, yet low-key piano solo with minor orchestral contingents, composed by cast member John Rubinstein (son of classical musician Arthur Rubinstein). When Family was picked up as a regular series for the fall 1976 schedule, the theme music was changed to a more cheery, upbeat instrumental dominated by trumpets and horns, also written by Rubinstein. This version lasted the rest of the run.

The opening title credits of Family prominently feature the Lawrence family home and lushly landscaped front yard. From 1976-78, the credits show Kate in front of the home saying goodbye to Doug in his car as he presumably leaves for work at his law firm. Kate then walks back inside the home and past the piano covered with framed photos of the entire family. The camera then focuses on the framed photos of each cast member. The early opening and closing credits feature a distinctive san serif typeface.

For the 1978-79 fourth season and the remainder of the series, a slightly revamped version of the opening credits once again focuses on the Lawrence home and features vignette scenes of each cast member (in lieu of the previously shown framed photos). At the end of the credits, the family is shown standing in front of the home to pose for a group photo. Notably, the opening and closing credits in the later years of the series switch from a san serif to a serif typeface.

Legal dispute
Family became the subject of a 24-year legal dispute due to a lawsuit filed by writer Jeri Emmet in 1977. The claim was against Spelling Television and alleged that Spelling had stolen the idea for the show from a script that Emmet had submitted, titled "The Best Years". Spelling responded to the lawsuit with a statement explaining that he had conceived the idea in his kitchen with Leonard Goldberg, his professional partner. Next they pitched the idea to scriptwriter Jay Presson Allen to create the pilot. She had just completed writing the screenplay for the film Funny Lady, starring Barbra Streisand and directed by Herbert Ross.

In October 1981, the suit was dismissed for lack of prosecution. Jeri Emmet filed an appeal the same month. Approximately a year later, she withdrew her appeal as part of a settlement with Spelling and Goldberg for $1,000. Emmet later filed a legal malpractice action against her own lawyers in which it was argued that she would have won her original lawsuit but for the malpractice. The case went to trial and a jury awarded her $1.7 million in damages. The verdict was then successfully appealed based on the resumption of the suit having occurred beyond a one-year limitation period allowed in the law: the trial result and judgment were overturned.

Emmet sued Spelling a second time, in 1996, after Spelling published his memoirs. She claimed that Spelling had defamed her in his book, as she had not been credited with conceiving the original idea for Family. She lost on appeal in 2001, with the court saying she had not met the standard for showing damages due to the alleged defamation and that she had not explained how the defamation legally constituted a second theft of the same intellectual property. The litigation finally concluded with Allen retaining her "Created by" credit for the series.

Home media and syndication
On September 5, 2006, Sony Pictures Home Entertainment released the first two seasons of Family on DVD in Region 1. On January, 2016, two box sets containing a total of 28 episodes were released in Germany by ALIVE VERTRIEBS- UND MARKETING. These box sets contain select episodes from seasons 1 to 3.

Beginning in July 2021, all five seasons of Family — uncut, were available for viewing on Tubi in their original broadcast running times, except for the season 4 episode 'Magic,' which appears in its syndicated edited form at 44 minutes in length (as opposed to the usual 49 minutes). The show was briefly unavailable from the Tubi library. However, as of July 2022, Family is on Tubi again. 

The show currently airs on MeTV+, a companion network to MeTV that is available in select TV markets.

Beginning in 2020, the Decades network broadcast limited sets of Family episodes as part of their Decades Weekend Binge, where a different TV series is highlighted each weekend. Family was featured one weekend in 2020 and again the weekend of January 14-15, 2023.

See also
 1976 in American television

References

External links

 
 DVD release planned

1976 American television series debuts
1980 American television series endings
1970s American drama television series
1980s American drama television series
American Broadcasting Company original programming
English-language television shows
Television series about families
Television series by Sony Pictures Television
Television series by Spelling Television
Television shows set in Pasadena, California